Leroy "Horsemouth" Wallace (born 22 August 1950) is a Jamaican drummer who worked for several years at Studio One, and has worked with numerous reggae artists including The Gladiators, Inner Circle, Prince Far I, Sound Dimension, Gregory Isaacs, Burning Spear, Ijahman Levi, Bruno Blum and Pierpoljak. He starred as himself in the lead role of the film Rockers. Wallace attended the Alpha Boys School in the 1960s and early 1970s, where he studied under Lennie Hibbert. Wallace also joined The Skatalites when they reformed in the mid-1970s. Wallace has been credited with inventing the 'Rockers' rhythm.

He has also recorded as a DJ on a number of tracks, for example "Herb Vendor", produced by Lee Perry, and "Universal Love", released under the pseudonym Mad Roy.

Solo discography
 Original Armageddon Dub, Stable One
 Far Beyond

Filmography
Leroy Wallace starred in the 1978 film Rockers, alongside Gregory Isaacs, Burning Spear, Big Youth, Dillinger and Jacob Miller with Inner Circle.

References

External links
 http://incolor.inetnebr.com/cvanpelt/hossie.html
 http://www.discogs.com/artist/Leroy+%22Horsemouth%22+Wallace
 Horsemouth Wallace at Roots Archives
 
 IT'S DANGEROUS The music of the film Rockers @ Reggae University 2019 (YouTube video correction on his date of birth : 22 August 1949 or most probably 1950

1950 births
Living people
Musicians from Kingston, Jamaica
Jamaican reggae musicians
Jamaican drummers